259 (two hundred [and] fifty-nine) is the natural number following 258 and preceding 260.

In mathematics
259 is:
a semiprime
63 + 62 + 6 + 1, so 259 is a repdigit in base 6 (11116)
a lucky number

References

Integers